Chandrakant Damodhar Handore (born 13 March 1957) is an Indian politician from Maharashtra. He is an Indian National Congress member and had represented Chembur in 12th Maharashtra Legislative Assembly in Vilasrao Deshmukh ministry. On 5 February 2021, Handore appointed as a Working President of the Maharashtra Pradesh Congress Committee.
He is former cabinet minister for Social Justice of the Government of Maharashtra.
He was elected Mayor of Mumbai for the period 1992 to 1993.
Handore was a vice President of the Maharashtra Pradesh Congress Committee for the period 2014 to 2021. Since 2020, he is also the in charge of the Mumbai Pradesh Congress Committee.  Handore is the founder and president of the "Bhim Shakti" (tran: The "Bhim's power" or "Ambedkar's power"), an Ambedkarite and socio-political organization.

Personal life 
Chandrakant Handore's mother's name is Hausabai  and father's name is Damodhar Handore. He is married to Mrs Sangita Handore, she is the current corporator of 125 Chembur, Brihanmumbai Municipal Corporation. They have four daughters Sonal, Prajyoti, Nikita and Priyanka, and a son Ganesh. Chandrakant Handore's family, inspired by B. R. Ambedkar, follows Buddhism.

Positions held 
 1985 - 1992: Corporator: Brihanmumbai Municipal Corporation
 1992-1993: Chairperson: Mayor Council Of Maharashtra
 1992 – 1993 : Mayor of Mumbai (RPI)
 2004 – 2009: Member of Maharashtra Legislative Assembly (1st term)
 2004 – 2009 : Cabinet Minister of Maharashtra (INC) 
 2008 – 2009 : Guardian Minister of Mumbai Suburban district
 2009 – 2014: Member of Maharashtra Legislative Assembly (2nd term)
 2014 - 2021 : vice president of the Maharashtra Pradesh Congress Committee
 December 2020 - current : In charge of the Mumbai Pradesh Congress
Former General Secretary Of Maharashtra Pradesh Congress Committee
Former General Secretary Of Mumbai Pradesh Congress Committee
5 February 2021- Current : Working President of the Maharashtra Pradesh Congress Committee

References

Maharashtra MLAs 2009–2014
Maharashtra MLAs 2004–2009
Indian Buddhists
20th-century Buddhists
21st-century Buddhists
Indian National Congress politicians from Maharashtra
People from Mumbai
Mayors of Mumbai
State cabinet ministers of Maharashtra
Republican Party of India politicians
1957 births
Living people